In legal systems based on common law, a partial defence is a defence that does not completely absolve the defendant of guilt. A claim of self-defence, for example, may be a complete defence to a charge of murder, leading to an acquittal; or it may be a partial defence, which leads to conviction to a lesser verdict, such as manslaughter. 

In England and Wales, successfully pleading a partial defence for murder may reduce the conviction to voluntary manslaughter. There are three types of partial defence - loss of control, diminished responsibility and suicide pact. These defences can only be applied to the charge of murder as per section 54 of the Coroners and Justice Act 2009.

References

Criminal defenses
Criminal law of the United Kingdom
Common law legal terminology